Lyutchik is a rural locality (a village) in Nikolskoye Rural Settlement, Sheksninsky District, Vologda Oblast, Russia. The population was 18 as of 2002.

Geography 
Lyutchik is located 7 km northeast of Sheksna (the district's administrative centre) by road. Sheksna is the nearest rural locality.

References 

Rural localities in Sheksninsky District